Millville Friends Meeting House is a meeting house located in Millville, Pennsylvania, and serves as a place of worship for the Religious Society of Friends, also known as Quakers.

History

Erected in 1795, the house recently celebrated its 200th anniversary and has a history of continuous use.
  It was originally constructed with two rooms, one for worship services and the other for school instruction. Descendants of John Eves, the founder of the town of Millville, and a Carlisle Indian student are buried in the on-site Quaker graveyard.

Community

The Millville Friends Meeting is part of a larger collection of meeting houses from the surrounding geographical area, called the Upper Susquehanna Quarterly Meeting. This collective of meetings and meeting houses comprises Elklands, Huntington, Lewisburg, Millville, North Branch, Pennsdale, State College, Sterling, Towanda and Wellsboro.  Services are held on the First Day (Sunday) and times vary depending on location.

School Affiliations

The Millville Friends Meeting House is affiliated with the Greenwood Friends School. The Millville Friends Meeting and Upper Susquehanna Quarterly Meeting help support this school.  Greenwood Friends School hosts students from 17 local school districts and provides education from preschool until grade 8.  The school was founded in 1978.  Greenwood Friends School is not a public school, therefore applications for acceptance and tuition is required for attendance.

See also
Catawissa Friends Meetinghouse
Roaring Creek Friends Meeting House

References

Churches in Columbia County, Pennsylvania
Quaker meeting houses in Pennsylvania
18th-century Quaker meeting houses